Nelson Thomas Potter Jr. (September 22, 1939 – May 12, 2013) was a professor of philosophy at the University of Nebraska-Lincoln, Lincoln, Nebraska, United States.

Intellectual biography
In 1961, he graduated summa cum laude from Monmouth College and in 1969, he received as Ph. D. from Johns Hopkins University in philosophy. In 1965, he became a faculty member of the Department of Philosophy at the University of Nebraska-Lincoln and was chair of the department from 1980 to 1985. He was a Woodrow Wilson Fellow and a member of Phi Beta Kappa.  His philosophical research focused on ethics, aesthetics, and the philosophy of Kant.  He retired and became professor emeritus in 2010.

Personal biography
He was born and raised in Mount Morris, Illinois, the son of professional baseball player Nels Potter and Hazel (Park) Potter. In 1978, he married Kathleen Johnson and had a daughter Sophia. He was a member of Nebraskans Against the Death Penalty and the ACLU.

Representative publications

 Kant and the Moral Worth of Actions. Southern Journal of Philosophy 34 (1996): 225–241.
 Kant on Obligation and Motivation in Law and Ethics. Jahrbuch fuer Recht und Ethik, Band 2 (1994), pp. 95–111.
 What is Wrong with Kant's Four Examples. Journal of Philosophical Research 43 (1993): 213–229.

References

External links
 Official website

2013 deaths
1939 births
20th-century American philosophers
University of Nebraska faculty
Kantian philosophers
Johns Hopkins University alumni
Philosophers of art
People from Mount Morris, Illinois